
Gmina Solec nad Wisłą is a rural gmina (administrative district) in Lipsko County, Masovian Voivodeship, in east-central Poland.

Villages
Gmina Solec nad Wisłą contains the villages and settlements of Boiska, Boiska-Kolonia, Dziurków, Glina, Kalinówek, Kłudzie, Kolonia Nadwiślańska, Las Gliniański, Marianów, Pawłowice, Przedmieście Bliższe, Przedmieście Dalsze, Raj, Sadkowice, Słuszczyn, Solec nad Wisłą, Wola Pawłowska, Zemborzyn Drugi, Zemborzyn Pierwszy and Zemborzyn-Kolonia. Until 2005 it also included Kępa Gostecka and Kępa Solecka, which are now in Gmina Łaziska in Lublin Voivodeship.

Neighbouring gminas
Gmina Solec nad Wisłą is bordered by the gminas of Chotcza, Józefów nad Wisłą, Łaziska, Lipsko and Tarłów.

References
Polish official population figures 2006

Solec nad Wisla
Lipsko County